Bias is an inclination toward something, or a predisposition, partiality, prejudice, preference, or predilection.

Bias may also refer to:

Scientific method and statistics 
 The bias introduced into an experiment through a confounder
 Algorithmic bias, machine learning algorithms that exhibit politically unacceptable behavior
 Cultural bias, interpreting  and judging phenomena in terms particular to one's own culture
 Funding bias, bias relative to the commercial interests of a study's financial sponsor
 Infrastructure bias, the influence of existing social or scientific infrastructure on scientific observations
 Publication bias, bias toward publication of certain experimental results
 Bias (statistics), the systematic distortion of a statistic
 Biased sample, a sample falsely taken to be typical of a population
 Estimator bias, a bias from an estimator whose expectation differs from the true value of the parameter
 Personal equation, a concept in 19th- and early 20th-century science that each observer had an inherent bias when it came to measurements and observations
 Reporting bias, a bias resulting from what is and isn't reported in research, either by participants in the research or by the researcher.

Cognitive science 
 Cognitive bias, any of a wide range of effects identified in cognitive science.
 Confirmation bias, tendency of people to favor information that confirm their beliefs of hypothesis
 See List of cognitive biases for a comprehensive list

Mathematics and engineering 

 Exponent bias, the constant offset of an exponent's value
 Inductive bias, the set of assumptions that a machine learner uses to predict outputs of given inputs that it has not encountered.
 Seat bias, any bias in a method of apportionment that favors either large or small parties over the other

Electricity 
 Biasing, a voltage or current added to an electronic device to move its operating point to a desired part of its transfer function
 Grid bias of a vacuum tube, used to control the electron flow from the heated cathode to the positively charged anode
 Tape bias (also AC bias), a high-frequency signal (generally from 40 to 150 kHz) added to the audio signal recorded on an analog tape recorder

Places 
 Bias, Landes, on the coast in southwestern France
 Bias, Lot-et-Garonne, in southwestern France
 Bias, West Virginia, a community in the United States
 Bias Bay, now called Daya Bay, in Guangdong Province, China
 Bias River, a river in north-western India

People 
 Bias (mythology), multiple figures in Greek mythology
 Bias Brahmin, a Brahmin community found in India
 Bias of Priene, one of the Seven Sages of Greece
 Bias, a Spartan commander caught in an ambush by the Athenian general Iphicrates
 Fanny Bias (1789–1825), French dancer, one of the first who raised on pointes
 Len Bias (1963–1986), American basketball player
 Oliver Bias (born 2001), footballer
 Tiffany Bias (born 1992), Thai basketball player

Organisations 
 BIAS (Berkley Integrated Audio Software), a software company specializing in sound processing software such as Peak and SoundSoap
 Bremer Institut für angewandte Strahltechnik (BIAS), a research institute dedicated to applied laser optics
 Belgian International Air Services (BIAS), a former airline from Belgium (1959–80) 
 Birla Institute of Applied Sciences (BIAS), a higher education institute located in Bhimtal, Uttaranchal, India

In other areas 
 Bias (book), a book by journalist Bernard Goldberg
 Bias (bird), the genus of the black-and-white shrike-flycatcher
 Bias (textile) of a woven fabric, the 45-degree diagonal line along which it is most stretchable
 Bias frame, an image obtained from an opto-electronic image sensor, with no actual exposure time
 Bias ratio (finance), an indicator used in finance to analyze the returns of investment portfolios, and in performing due diligence
 Media bias, the influence journalists and news producers have in selecting stories to report and how they are covered

See also 
 Handedness
 Bias-ply